Octal base may refer to:
A vacuum tube socket with an eight-pin base
The octal, or base-8, numeral system